Bogobe jwa lerotse, also known as slap-pap, is a type of porridge eaten in Botswana and also a national dish of Botswana, characterized by a delicate flavor imparted by the lerotse melon, a type of fruit that is visually reminiscent of a typical watermelon and distinguished by its orange-colored flesh. Lerotse has a neutral flavor when raw, but it imparts a unique flavor to the dish when cooked. The dish is typically stirred with a traditional wooden whisk, called lehetho, and has a porridge-like consistency when fully cooked. It is often consumed at weddings and other social gathering.

Its key ingredient is the lerotse melon, a less-sweet variety of watermelon indigenous to Botswana which is more similar in taste to the cucumber when raw. Along with the lerotse, which is chopped into pieces and boiled, the dish includes sorghum meal and sour milk.

Ingredients 

 ½ of one lerotse (melon)
 1 kg bopi jwa mabele (sorghum)
 1 cup madila (sour milk)
 Mayonnaise (optional in place of madila)
 water

See also
 List of melon dishes

References

External links
 Botswanayouth.com
 Spar Botswana

Melon dishes